Kannur district is politically organized into a complex web of taluks, blocks, panchayaths and villages. In addition, there are also parliamentary divisions called Assembly constituencies and Lok Sabha constituencies.

History
Kannur district came into existence as an administrative unit on 1 January 1957, when the erstwhile Malabar District and Kasaragod taluk of Madras state were reconstituted into three revenue districts, viz; Kannur, Kozhikode and Palakkad.  At the time of its formation, the district consisted of seven taluks, viz, Kasaragod, Hosdurg, Taliparamba, Kannur, Thalassery, North Wayanad and South Wayanad. Subsequently, the South Wayanad taluk was included in Kozhikode district with effect from 15 March 1957.  Later, on first November 1980, Wayanad District was formed carving out South Wayanad and North Wayanad taluks. The two northernmost taluks of Kannur District, viz; Kasaragod and Hosdurg were separated on 24 May 1984 for the formation of Kasaragod District.A new Iritty taluk was formed in 2014 dividing Thalassery and Thaliparamba taluks and Payyanur Taluk was created by carving Taliparamba taluk and Kannur taluk in 2018. Thus Kannur District now has five taluks, viz., Kannur, Taliparamba, Payyanur, Thalassery and Iritty. Thalassery is also known as Tellicherry.

There are nine development blocks comprising 71 grama panchayats. The development blocks are Kannur, Edakkad, Irikkur, Iritty, Kuthuparamba, Payyannur, Peravoor, Taliparamba and Thalassery.

There is one municipal corporation and 9 municipalities in Kannur district.  Kannur is the only municipal corporation and the municipalities are Thalassery, Taliparamba, Payyannur, Kuthuparamba, Mattannur, Anthoor, Panoor, Iritty, and Sreekandapuram.

The state legislative constituencies of the District are: Irikkur, Payyanur, Taliparamba, Kalliasseri, Azhikode, Kannur, Dharmadom, Thalassery, Mattanur, Kuthuparamba and Peravoor.

Parliament Constituency
Kannur district falls into 3 parliament constituencies.

• Kannur

• Kasaragod

• Vatakara

Assembly Constituencies
Kannur district have 11 Assembly constituencies:
Payyanur
Kalliasseri
Taliparamba
Azhikode
Kannur
Irikkur
Thalassery
Dharmadom
Mattanur
Kuthuparamba
Peravoor

Members of Parliament
Madras State
1951: A.K. Gopalan, Communist Party of India

After the formation of Kerala

1977: C.K. Chandrappan, Communist Party of India
1980: K. Kunhambu, Indian National Congress (Urs)
1984: Mullappally Ramachandran, Indian National Congress
1989: Mullappally Ramachandran, Indian National Congress
1991: Mullappally Ramachandran, Indian National Congress
1996: Mullappally Ramachandran, Indian National Congress
1998: Mullappally Ramachandran, Indian National Congress
1999: A.P. Abdullakutty, Communist Party of India (Marxist)
2004: A.P. Abdullakutty, Communist Party of India (Marxist)
2009: K. Sudhakaran, Indian National Congress
2014: P K Sreemathy, Communist Party of India (Marxist)
2019: K. Sudhakaran, Indian National Congress

Indian general election, 2014
Left Democratic Front (LDF) has fielded former minister P. K. Sreemathy as the candidate in the Lok Sabha Elections 2014. Sitting MP K. Sudhakaran will be the United Democratic Front (UDF) candidate.

Taluks of Kannur district

Kannur district is divided into five taluks, Thalassery, Kannur, Iritty, Taliparamba and Payyannur. Thalassery has 35 villages, Kannur has 28 villages, Iritty has 20 villages, Taliparamba has 28 and Payyanur has 22 villages.

Kannur
The taluk office of Kannur is located at South Bazar or Caltex junction in Kannur.  The headquarters is in an old British building near to the modern civil station.  
Constituent villages
Kannur Taluk has 28 villages. 
 Anjarakandi, Azhikode North, Azhikode South and Chelora
 Chembilode, Cherukkunnu and Chirakkal
 Edakkad, Elayavoor, Iriveri and Kadambur
 Kalliasseri, Kanhirod, Kannadiparamba, Kannapuram
 Kannur-1, Kannur-2, Makrery and Mattool
 Mavilayi, Munderi, Muzhappilangad and Narath
 Pallikkunnu, Pappinisseri, Puzhathi, Valapattanam and Valiyannur
Kannur taluk is an administrative division of Kannur district of Kerala, India.

Taliparamba 
The headquarters of Taliparamba Taluk is located in Taliparamba. 

Taliparamba Taluk has 28 villages
 Alakode, Anthoor, Chelery and Chengalayi
 Chuzhali, Eruvessi and Irikkur
 Kayaralam, Kolachery, Kooveri, Kurumathur, Kuttiyattoor
 Kuttiyeri, Malappattam, Maniyoor, Mayyil and Morazha
 Naduvil, Nidiyanga, Panniyoor, Pariyaram, Pattuvam and Payyavoor
 Sreekandapuram, Taliparamba, Thimiri, Udayagiri and Velladu

Taliparamba is home to a number of temples, churches and mosques. Temples include the Rajarajeshwara Temple, Trichambaram Temple and Parassinikkadavu Temple. Taliparamba Juma Masjid and St. Mary's Church are other prominent religious centres in the town.

Thalassery 

Thalassery Taluk has 35 villages. 
 Cheruvanchery, Chokli, Dharmadam and Erancholi
 Eruvatty, Kadirur, Kandankunnu and Kannavam
 Keezhallur, Kodiyeri, Kolavallur and Kolayad
 Koodali, Kottayam, Kuthuparamba and Mananthery
 Mangattidam, Mokery, New Mahe and Paduvilayi
 Panniyannur, Panoor, Pathiriyad and Pattanur
 Pattiam, Peringalam, Peringathur and Pinarayi
 Puthur, Shivapuram, Thalassery and Thiruvangad
 Tholambra, Thripangothur and Vekkalam Kuthuparamba Vengad

Iritty 
Iritty Taluk has 20 villages
 Aralam, Ayyankunnu, Chavasseri and Kalliad
 Kanichar, Karikottakari, Keezhur and Kelakam 
Kolari, Kottiyoor, Manathana and Muzhakkunnu 
Nuchiyad, Padiyoor, Payam and Pazhassi 
Thillankeri, Vayathur, Vellarvalli and Vilamana

Payyanur 
Payyanur taluk has 22 villages
 Alappadamba, Cheruthazham,  
Eramam, Ezhome
 Kadannnappally, Kankol, Karivellur, Korom
 Kuttur, Kunhimangalam, Madayi, Panappuzha
 Payyanur, Peralam, Peringome, Perinthatta, Pulingome
 Ramanthali, Thirumeni, Vayakkara, Vellora, Vellur

Eastern villages
 Cherupuzha
 Pulingome
 Udayagiri
 Alakode
 Velladu
 Naduvil
 Eruvessi
 Payyavoor
 Ulikkal
 Ayyankunnu
 Edoor
 Aralam
 Peravoor
 Kottiyoor

See also
 Indian general election, 2014 (Kerala)
 Kannur
 List of Constituencies of the Lok Sabha
 Thalassery
 Vatakara

References

External links
 Election Commission of India: https://web.archive.org/web/20081218010942/http://www.eci.gov.in/StatisticalReports/ElectionStatistics.asp

Politics of Kannur district